Navid or Naveed may refer to:

Navid (satellite), an experimental Iranian earth observation satellite
Naveed (album), a 1994 album by Our Lady Peace
"Naveed" (song), a 1995 single by Our Lady Peace

People with the name

Politics
Anthony Naveed, Pakistani politician
Rukhsana Naveed, Pakistani politician
Shakeela Naveed, Pakistani politician
Naveed Amir, Pakistani politician
Naveed Anwar, Canadian politician
Naveed Dero, Pakistani politician
Naveed Qamar (born 1955), Pakistani politician

Sport
Mohammad Naveed (born 1987), Emirati cricketer
Navid Afkari (1993–2020), Iranian wrestler executed by the government of the Islamic Republic of Iran 
Naveed Ahmed (born 1993), Pakistani footballer
Naveed Akram (born 1984), Pakistani footballer
Naveed Nawaz (born 1973), Sri Lankan cricketer
Navid Faridi (born 1977), Iranian footballer
Naveed Obaid (born 2000), Afghan cricketer
Navid Dayyani (born 1987), Danish footballer and businessman
Navid Khosh Hava (born 1991), Iranian footballer
Navid Maleksabet (born 1991), Iranian squash player
Navid Mashinchi (born 1989), German-born Canadian soccer player and scout
Navid Nasimi (born 1995), Ukrainian footballer of Iranian descent
Navid Nasseri (born 1996), Iranian professional footballer
Navid Niktash (born 1991), Iranian-French basketball player
Navid Rahman (born 1996), Pakistani Canadian footballer
Navid Rezaeifar (born 1996), Iranian basketball player
Nawid Mohammad Kabir (born 2001), Afghan cricketer

Other people
Asfandyar Abid Naveed, journalist killed in the June 2011 Peshawar bombings
Hamid Naweed, Afghan-American writer and art historian
Sara Naveed, Pakistani author
Naveed Jamali (born 1976), American commentator on national security
Naveed Mahbub, Bangladeshi comedian and columnist
Naveed Mukhtar, Pakistani army general and spymaster
Naveed Nour (born 1963), German artist
Navíd Akhavan (born 1980), Iranian-German actor, also known as Navid Navid
Navid Mohammadzadeh (born 1986), Iranian actor
Navid Zargari, Canadian electrical engineer
Naweed Syed, Pakistani-born Canadian neuroscientist
Naweed Zaman, Pakistani army general

Characters
Navid Harrid, a character in Scottish sitcom Still Game
Navid Shirazi, a character in American teen drama 90210

See also